Cherokee Plantation is a historic house in Fort Payne, Alabama.  The house was built in 1790 as a two-story log cabin by Andrew Ross, a judge on the Cherokee Supreme Court and brother of Principal Chief John Ross.  In 1834 a second log cabin was built connected to the rear of the original cabin, and a third was built to the northeast, separated by a breezeway.  Ross, being one-eighth Cherokee, was forced to leave his home in 1838 under the provisions of the Treaty of New Echota, of which Ross was a signatory; a portion of the Cherokee Trail of Tears passes in front of the house.

The house passed to William W. McFarlane, who enclosed and expanded it further in 1845, giving the house its present Greek Revival appearance.  The Kershaw family made further modifications and renovations in the 1930s and 1960s.  Current owners, the Brewer family, have continued the renovations. The house was listed on the Alabama Register of Landmarks and Heritage in 1976 and the National Register of Historic Places in 1984.

References

National Register of Historic Places in DeKalb County, Alabama
Greek Revival houses in Alabama
Houses completed in 1821
Houses in DeKalb County, Alabama
Properties on the Alabama Register of Landmarks and Heritage